The  is a residential skyscraper located in Kawaguchi, Saitama Prefecture, Japan. Completed in 1998, it stands at 186 m (610 ft) tall. It was the tallest residential building in Japan until 2004, when Acty Shiodome overtook it.

References

Residential buildings completed in 1998
Residential skyscrapers in Japan
Buildings and structures in Kawaguchi, Saitama
1998 establishments in Japan